Marcel Blanchard (19 August 1890 – 11 August 1977) was a French equestrian. He competed in the individual dressage event at the 1920 Summer Olympics.

References

1890 births
1977 deaths
French male equestrians
Olympic equestrians of France
Equestrians at the 1920 Summer Olympics
Place of birth missing